"Getting Nowhere" is a song by English electronic music project Magnetic Man featuring American singer John Legend. It is the third single to be released from their debut album Magnetic Man. It was released on 18 February 2011. It only managed to peak to number 65 on the UK Singles Chart but had some success in Flanders where it reached number four. The song was also used in a Sony PlayStation Move advert in November 2011.

Critical reception
Nick Levine of Digital Spy gave the song a positive review stating:

On which Artwork, Benga and Skream – the commanding triptych of Croydon clubland, if you will – team up with nine-time Grammy Award winner John Legend to reaffirm what the James Blake album has recently suggested – that dubstep can possess genuine gets-you-in-the-guts soul.

Track listing

Chart performance

Release history

References

2011 singles
Songs written by Amanda Ghost
Magnetic Man songs
John Legend songs
Song recordings produced by Magnetic Man
Songs written by John Legend